Wharton Creek is a  tributary of the Unadilla River in western Otsego County, in the state of New York. Via the Unadilla River, it is part of the Susquehanna River watershed, flowing to Chesapeake Bay.

Wharton Creek rises in the town of Richfield and flows southwest through the towns of Plainfield, Exeter, Burlington, Edmeston, and Pittsfield, where it empties into the Unadilla River at the village of New Berlin.

Tributaries
Fly Brook converges with Wharton Creek south of Burlington Flats. Dundee Brook converges with Wharton Creek north-northeast of Burlington Flats.

See also
List of rivers in New York

References

Rivers of New York (state)
Rivers of Otsego County, New York